Bolzon is a surname. Notable people with the surname include:

Nereo Bolzon (born 1960), Canadian football player
Robert Bolzon (born 1967), Australian rules footballer